Eat Your Heart Out is an Australian rock band formed in Newcastle in 2012. After playing in the Snake Or Die Tour in 2016, they signed to label Fearless Records in 2017 and headlined their own Carried Away Tour. In 2018 they toured with Movements, whose member Patrick Miranda has also collaborated with the band on the tracks "Conscience" and "Carousel".

Members

Current
 Caitlin Henry – lead vocals 
 Will Moore – guitar 
 Jake Cronin – drums 

Former
 Andrew Anderson – guitar 
 Dom Cant – bass

Discography

Albums
Florescence (2019), under Fearless Records
Can't Stay Forever (2022) under Fearless Records

EPs
Distance Between Us (2015)
Carried Away (2017), under Fearless Records
Mind Games (2017), under Fearless Records

Singles
"Carousel" (2019), on Florescence
"Spinning" (2019), on Florescence
"Closer to the Sun" (2019), on Florescence

References

Musical quintets
Musical groups established in 2012
Australian grunge groups
New South Wales musical groups
Newcastle, New South Wales
Australian alternative metal musical groups
Female-fronted musical groups
2012 establishments in Australia